The West County Energy Center is a natural gas power plant in Palm Beach County, Florida. The power plant features three 1,250MW multi-shaft combined cycle gas turbine generating units on a  site. The facility has been online since 2009, with all three generators reaching completion in 2011. It is the largest natural gas power plant in the United States.

See also
List of largest power stations in the United States

References

2009 establishments in Florida
Energy infrastructure completed in 2009
Fossil fuel power stations in the United States
Power stations in Florida
Buildings and structures in Palm Beach County, Florida